The Nagartha or Nagarta are Vaishya as per Hindu caste of south India of merchants or agriculturalists.

The Nagartha live in the southern Karnataka districts of Mysore, Bangalore, Kolar, and Tumkur and in northern Tamil Nadu. The caste contains two main divisions, Vaishnavas or Namadhari Nagarthas and Saiva or Lingadhari Nagarthas.

References

Merchant castes
Social groups of Karnataka